Saint Francis Receiving the Stigmata is an oil painting on canvas by Peter Paul Rubens, produced for the Franciscan monastic church in Ghent, probably part of a commission for three works for the same church – the others were St Mary Magdalene in Ecstasy (Palace of Fine Arts, Lille) and  The Virgin Mary and Saint Francis Saving the World from Christ's Anger (Royal Museum of Fine Arts, Brussels). It measures 265.5 cm (104.5 in) x 193 cm (75.9 in) and has been variously dated to around 1630 and to between 1615 and 1620. 

Frans Pilsen, Philippe Lambert, Joseph Spruyt and Willem Pieterszoon Buytewech all produced prints of it.

In 1797 the painting was seized from Saint Peter's Abbey, Ghent to form part of a new 'Nationaal Museum', which opened to the public in 1802. It now hangs in the Museum of Fine Arts, Ghent.

Sources
http://www.vlaamsekunstcollectie.be/collection.aspx?p=0848cab7-2776-4648-9003-25957707491a&inv=S-9

Paintings in the collection of the Museum of Fine Arts, Ghent
1610s paintings
1630s paintings
Rubens
Paintings by Peter Paul Rubens
Paintings depicting the Crucifixion of Jesus
Skulls in art